Jet Ski may refer to:

 Jet Ski, a Kawasaki personal watercraft
 Any personal watercraft
 "Jetski" (song), by Internet Money, Lil Tecca and Lil Mosey
 Kawasaki Jet Ski, a video game for the Wii console
 A song by Bikini Kill from the album Reject All American
 Lil Pump, a US rapper's stage name